The 2018–19 Charleston Southern Buccaneers men's basketball team represented Charleston Southern University during the 2018–19 NCAA Division I men's basketball season. The Buccaneers, led by 14th-year head coach Barclay Radebaugh, played their home games at the CSU Field House in North Charleston, South Carolina as members of the Big South Conference. They finished the season 18–16, 9–7 in Big South play to finish in a four-way tie for fifth place. They defeated UCS Upstate and Winthrop to advance to the semifinals of the Big South tournament where they lost to Radford. They were invited to the CollegeInsider.com Tournament where they defeated Florida Atlantic in the first round before falling in the second round to fellow Big South member Hampton.

Previous season
The Buccaneers They finished the season 15–16, 9–9 in Big South play to finish in a four-way tie for fifth place. As the No. 8 seed in the Big South tournament, they defeated Presbyterian in the first round before losing in the quarterfinals to UNC Asheville.

Roster

Schedule and results

|-
!colspan=9 style=| Exhibition

|-
!colspan=9 style=| Non-conference regular season

|-
!colspan=9 style=| Big South regular season

|-
!colspan=9 style=|Big South tournament

|-
!colspan=12 style=|CollegeInsider.com Postseason tournament
|-

References

Charleston Southern Buccaneers men's basketball seasons
Charleston Southern
Charleston Southern Buccaneers men's basketball
Charleston Southern Buccaneers men's basketball
Charleston Southern